This is a comprehensive list of the 2,560 municipalities in Pennsylvania ordered by population. Under Pennsylvania law, there are four types of incorporated municipalities in the Commonwealth. From those largest in population to smallest, and excluding the single town, Bloomsburg, these are:
 Cities (see cities list)
 Boroughs (see boroughs list)
 Townships (see townships list)

This list only includes incorporated areas and does not include many other communities with often better known or famous names; for example, Levittown is a sizable census-designated place that straddles multiple municipalities. Many others today are neighborhoods, once organized about a railroad passenger station or post office.

Municipalities

Cities

List
† -- County seat

^ -- Consolidated city-county

See also
 List of cities in Pennsylvania
 List of counties in Pennsylvania
 List of Pennsylvania Municipalities and Counties with Home Rule Charters, Optional Charters, or Optional Plans
 List of towns and boroughs in Pennsylvania
 List of townships in Pennsylvania

References

External links
 
 

Pennsylvania, List of cities in
Municipalities in Pennsylvania
Municipalities